Code Monkeys is an American adult animated television program by Adam de la Peña. Set in the early 1980s, it follows the adventures of fictional video game company GameaVision. The show ran for two seasons, from 2007 to 2008, on G4 and G4 Canada.

Plot
The plot of Code Monkeys revolves around the fictitious video game company GameaVision (a play on companies like Activision and Intellivision) and its eccentric employees, mainly the slacker Dave and his high-strung friend Jerry. The entire series takes place in the Silicon Valley city of Sunnyvale, California during the 1980s. Code Monkeys relies on crude humor and stoner comedy to convey the numerous references to video games, past and present, but mostly games from the 8-bit era. This also extends to cameos from well known video game developers, who appear in the show pitching their ideas to GameaVision for the games that would later make them famous, usually to be rejected, insulted, and sometimes injured or killed off.

Episode structure

Code Monkeys is presented as though it were an 8-bit video game. In keeping with this format, characters, backgrounds and other objects are rendered with an 8-bit color palette, occasionally leading to trouble animating specific objects. Most episodes begin with a screen flashing "PLAYER 1 START!"; episodes end with a black "Game Over" screen, with a "kill screen" appearing after the production company logo in the first season. Before each commercial break, a small pause box typically appears in the middle of the screen which freezes the scene. On the two occasions when Jerry "dies", a "Game Over/Continue?" box appears, with the "player" contemplating selecting "No", but then choosing "Yes" to continue the episode. Near the end of "Todd Loses His Mind", the episode "crashes" abruptly, forcing the "player" to eject the "game cartridge" to blow dust off its connectors, and the episode is reset to its beginning, thus negating everything that happened in the episode. The show also features status bars at the top and bottom of the frame, which display a running counter of points earned by the characters doing video game-like actions in each episode, a health meter for the current characters, narrative asides based on certain characters' actions or dialogue, and other humorous sayings or pictures based on an episode's story line. Characters also use similar methods to show emotions, such as air humping (usually to exaggerate sexuality or awesomeness), or throwing up the sign of the horns. The show is entirely computer animated, with the exception of the "game crash" scene in "Todd Loses His Mind", and is done in-house at the G4 studios in Los Angeles. The original music for the show, video game-styled underscore, is composed by Jon and Al Kaplan. Other music prominently featured in the series includes music by Los Angeles heavy metal group Tinhorn. Jonathan Coulton's song "Code Monkey" serves as the theme song of the show.

Characters
Dave (voiced by Adam de la Peña) — Dave is the lead character of the show and the de facto lead programmer at GameaVision. A constant slacker, he focuses his attention more on playing games than actually making them. Dave is also a frequent cannabis user; he claimed that most of his game ideas were conceived while he was high. Dave often grosses out his co-workers by either throwing up in front of them, having his pants down at inopportune moments, humping random people or objects, or performing other lewd acts. A rampant hedonist, the only things that seem to motivate Dave are money, drugs, and sex. Most of the show's and characters' predicaments are caused by Dave's erratic and impulsive actions.  While he considers Jerry to be his best friend, Dave often insults him and manipulates his emotions.  Despite his quirks, Dave has a flair to all of his actions and is a competent game programmer.
Jerry (voiced by Matt Mariska) — Jerry is the show's other main character and Dave's best friend, fellow programmer, and office-mate. Unlike Dave, Jerry is hard-working, responsible, and tidy. However, usually under Dave's negative influence, Jerry will succumb to sinful pleasures, often with disastrous outcomes. Jerry's running gags throughout the series deal with his unrequited crush on fellow programmer Mary (who constantly rejects him), fixing the damage Dave causes, wetting himself when nervous or threatened, and his insecurities and weak will.
Bob "Big" T. Larrity (voiced by Andy Sipes) — Mr. Larrity is the current head of GameaVision, a Texan billionaire who bought the company from Steve Wozniak, despite the fact that he knows nothing about video games, only that they're sure to make him rich. Larrity often employs various illegal methods to make his fortune. In addition to being ignorant, Larrity is violent, manic, bigoted, and misogynistic. Despite his apparent stupidity, Larrity can be quite cunning and manipulative. He treats his employees with no respect, but still cares about them to some degree, particularly for Dave, Jerry, and Benny who he sees as his surrogate sons. Larrity and Black Steve also share a begrudging respect for each other over their shooting prowess.
Dean Larrity (voiced by Andy Sipes) — Dean is Mr. Larrity's extremely muscular son. He is appointed by his father as GameaVision's Head Supervisor. Dean has limited interaction with the other employees, doesn't participate in any of the programming, and doesn't even seem to do any actual work, aside from helping his dad cover up his illegal activities. He often uses violence to solve problems.
Todd (voiced by Dana Snyder) — Todd is GameaVision's resident fantasy game designer, an obese 33-year-old geek who is always seen wearing a horned helmet. Todd's narcissism, use of pretentious language, and eccentricity, often blurring the lines between his Dungeons & Dragons-inspired fantasy and reality, makes him the most despised employee at the company; other characters often refer to him as "creepy" and "douche". Todd also lives with his mother, with whom he has a (very) near-incestuous relationship.
Black Steve (voiced by Tony Strickland) — Black Steve is GameaVision's accountant and, as his nickname would imply, he is the only black person working at the company. He is foul-mouthed, ill-tempered and racist against white people. Despite his position, Black Steve has contributed games to the company, mostly themed to his prejudice towards white people. He is apparently fluent in Japanese and conversational Arabic. He is also a former pro wrestler known as "The Black Shadow" as well as graduate of Dartmouth. Though bigoted towards whites, Black Steve does coexist with his co-workers and even has garnered Larrity's respect due to his violent temper and love of guns.
Mary (voiced by Gretchen McNeil) — Mary is GameaVision's sole female programmer, and consequently isn't taken seriously by any of the other sexist employees, with the exception of Jerry, who has a major crush on her but is rebuffed due to his friendship with Dave and overall spinelessness. Compared to her boss and co-workers, Mary is considered to be the most level-headed employee at GameaVision. She is often accused of being a lesbian because of her strong beliefs in feminism; a majority of the games she designs are targeted at girls or revolve around women's issues in some way.
Clare (voiced by Suzanne Keilly) — Clare is GameaVision's receptionist. The antithesis to Mary, Clare is airheaded, self-centered, self-conscious, and sexually promiscuous, even going as far as partaking in BDSM-related activities. However, like Mary, Clare is often treated with little to no respect by her co-workers.
Benny (voiced by Dana Snyder) — Benny is a Korean child, illegally adopted by Larrity to test the company's games. He is fed a diet of cigarettes, Pixy Stix, bags of pure sugar, and amphetamines to stunt his growth and keep him game-testing nonstop. As a result, Benny is constantly hyper and usually spends his time roaming through the building's ventilation and plumbing systems, making a side living selling things to employees. No game can be shipped without Benny's approval, which causes the programmers, namely Dave and Jerry, to repeatedly bribe him with (often illegal) treats and toys. He is often accompanied by a taciturn, muscular bodyguard.
Clarence (voiced by Lionel Tubbins) — Clarence is GameaVision's audio designer. Flamboyantly gay, he wears sparkly jumpsuits, sings effectively all of his dialogue, and constantly makes blatant references to gay sex. He has also demonstrated the abilities to levitate and pass through walls, using "gay magic" which can be toggled on and off, possibly a play on the "fairy" pejorative of homosexuality. Occasionally, Clarence pitches homosexually-themed games to the company.

History
While working on the pilot of Minoriteam for Cartoon Network and Adult Swim, Adam de la Peña began writing a script for what would become Code Monkeys. The original title for the show was Dave And Jerry VS The World, but the name was changed to Code Monkeys after receiving the rights to use the Jonathan Coulton song of the same name. After making a seven-minute animation test, he began shopping for a network to broadcast the show. He settled with G4 because he thought they understood the premise of the show the most. G4 allowed him to make a full-length pilot and subsequently picked up the show for 13 episodes and after a successful first season ratings-wise, the show was picked up for a second season.

Several months before Code Monkeys began airing, G4 launched an advertising campaign for the show in which GameaVision was presented as a real game company. There were two commercial advertisements for the fictitious games "Crosswalk" and "Barfight", the games "Sir Eats-A-Lot" and "Floating Space Rocks" were featured in a "Cheat! G-Spot" segment, and "Barfight" was featured in an episode of Attack of the Show. G4 created a website for GameaVision's, featuring two playable games: "2 Card Monte", which cannot be won; and "Hangman", which contains fewer than 10 words, all of which are meant to insult the player. These playable games can be found on both discs of the Code Monkeys DVD, both having a separate Flash game link, including each their own individual SWF files.

On February 27, 2017, Adam De La Pena tweeted "And then there's this....gameavision.com", hinting at the show's return. As of 2021, the same year that G4 relaunched, nothing has come to materialize.

Episodes

Season 1 (2007)

Season 2 (2008)

Reception
According to the president of G4, the first season was a huge success for the network. During its first season the show was watched by more than 20 million people. Since its inception, Code Monkeys has received mixed reviews. Virginia Heffernan of The New York Times called the show a "promising idea [with] gags [told in a South Park deadpan dialect that] has a fast free-for-all quality, as if they were produced by a zealous Galaga player with his palm down flat on the "fire" button." Scott Jon Siegel of Joystiq agreed, saying that "Code Monkeys has potential, [but] squanders it." He went on to say that "there was hope that G4 could deliver something actually watchable. [Code Monkeys] isn't." Jake Swearingen of Wired magazine stated that the show would appeal to "anyone who spent their youth blowing dust out of Nintendo cartridges and developing Contra-induced carpal tunnel syndrome." Furthermore, he compared Code Monkeys to arcade games of the 1980s, stating "[m]uch like the classics it riffs on, Code quickly veers into the wildly surreal." Andy Grieser of Zap2it called the show "the funniest ... animation this side of South Park." He called the graphics "instant nostalgia for thirty-somethings." Will Harris of Bullz-Eye.com gave the show a 3.5/5 and commented that Code Monkeys is a "twisted little show", but that it's "not for all tastes."

Streaming
The series is available for streaming on Peacock.

Home media
Shout! Factory, partnering with G4, released a two-disc DVD set of the first season of Code Monkeys on August 5, 2008 in Region 1.

References

External links

 

2000s American adult animated television series
2000s American animated comedy television series
2007 American television series debuts
2008 American television series endings
American adult animated comedy television series
American flash adult animated television series
English-language television shows
G4 (American TV network) original programming
Television shows about video games
Television series set in the 1980s